Francies is a surname. Notable people with the surname include:

Michael Francies (born 1956), British solicitor
Chris Francies (born 1982), American football player
Coye Francies (born 1986), American football player
Duane Francies (1921–2004), American military aviator

See also
Francis (disambiguation)